Jeffrey Wayne Gorton (born November 1, 1962) is an American murderer and rapist, who was convicted in 2002 of the rape and murder of flight attendant Nancy Ludwig on February 17, 1991, at the (then) Hilton hotel in Romulus, Michigan. He later pleaded no contest to charges that he raped and murdered a professor and provost of the University of Michigan-Flint, Margarette Eby, on November 9, 1986.

The two rapes and murders were proved to be the work of one person by matching semen samples taken from the two crime scenes. Gorton had left a latent fingerprint at the Eby crime scene; when it was matched to him, the Michigan State Police learned the killer's identity. Gorton was then proven to be the rapist by matching the DNA of his semen with that of the samples taken from the two murder victims.

Gorton was sentenced to life imprisonment without parole.

The murders of both Margarette Eby and Nancy Ludwig by Gorton were depicted in the episode "Silk Stalkings" in the television series Forensic Files as well as in the Investigation Discovery television series Your Worst Nightmare in the episode "Fight or Flight".

See also
 List of homicides in Michigan

References

Offender Tracking System

1962 births
Living people
1986 murders in the United States
1991 murders in the United States
American rapists
American people convicted of murder
People convicted of murder by Michigan
American prisoners sentenced to life imprisonment
Prisoners sentenced to life imprisonment by Michigan
American male criminals
Place of birth missing (living people)